Yasuo Uchida was a Japanese author who is one of the best-selling fiction authors and his works has been sold more than 500 million copies. 115 million copies of his book has published.

References 

Japanese male writers